The Office of the Commonwealth Director of Public Prosecutions or, informally, the Commonwealth Director of Public Prosecutions (CDPP) is an independent prosecuting service and government agency within the portfolio of the Attorney-General of Australia, as a part of the Attorney-General's Department. It was established by the Director of Public Prosecutions Act 1983 (Cth) and began its operations in 1984.

History
Founded on 8 March 1984 to prosecute alleged offences against Commonwealth criminal law, primarily the Crimes Act 1914 (Cth) and Criminal Code Act 1995 (Cth), the CDPP was first headed by Director Ian Temby, who remained in that post until 1988. The CDPP commenced with a head office in Canberra, and a Melbourne office was opened on 6 June 1984, assuming responsibility for the work of Special Prosecutor Robert Redlich. The CDPP took over the work of the Special Prosecutors to prosecute bottom of the harbour tax cases and parts of the Attorney-General's Departments Deputy Crown Solicitor's Offices.

The CDPP has been noted for its gender-blind hiring and work practices.

Function
The agency has only one outcome; "to contribute to the safety and well-being of the people of Australia and to help protect the resources of the Commonwealth through the maintenance of law and order and by combating crime". It upholds this function by carrying out prosecutions of crimes against the Commonwealth, and by providing advice to referring agencies.

It has no investigative power or function, and the decision to investigate matters and refer matters to the CDPP is at the discretion of referring agency. Furthermore, the CDPP depends on referring agencies to investigate alleged offences and prepare briefs of evidence to support prosecution and assets recovery.

Organisation
The Commonwealth Director of Public Prosecutions is based in the head office in Canberra and has offices in Adelaide, Brisbane, Cairns, Darwin, Hobart, Melbourne, Perth, Sydney, and Townsville. Most offices include a Revenue and Benefit Fraud/Commercial, Financial and Corruption Branch, an Illegal Imports and Exports/Human Exploitation and Border Protection Branch, and an Organised Crime and Counter Terrorism Branch.

Although the Commonwealth Director of Public Prosecutions is within the portfolio of the Commonwealth Attorney-General, the Office operates independently of the Attorney-General and of the political process. The Attorney-General, as First Law Officer of Australia, is responsible for the Commonwealth criminal justice system and remains accountable to Parliament for decisions made in the prosecution process, notwithstanding that those decisions are now in fact made by the Director and lawyers of the CDPP. Under section 8 of the Director of Public Prosecutions Act 1983 (Cth), the Attorney-General has power to issue guidelines and directions to the CDPP; however, that can only be done after there has been consultation between the Attorney-General and the Director. Per the Act, any guidelines or directions must be in writing, published in the Gazette, and tabled in Parliament. The CDPP has been directed by the Attorney-General only thrice, none of which were in relation to a specific case.

List of Commonwealth Directors of Public Prosecutions

See also

 Director of Public Prosecutions (New South Wales)
 Director of Public Prosecutions (Victoria)

References

External links

1984 establishments in Australia
Commonwealth Government agencies of Australia
Commonwealth